Balel Pipariya is a City  in the Amreli district, Gujarat, India.

Demographics
 India census Balel Pipariya had a population of 10,789. Males constitute 52% of the population and females 48%. Balel Pipariya has an average literacy rate of 70%, higher than the national average of 59.5%; with 56% of the males and 44% of females literate. 12% of the population is under 6 years of age. 
 Around 10,000 Population in Balel Pipariya, 50% people live in outside of a like Surat, Ahmedabad & Mumbai, Rajkot
Balel Pipariya was famous for cotton farming.

Population

Region
 Ahir    
 Patel

Famous Palaces 

 Aadhya Shakti Temple
 Khodiyar Temple 
 Hiravav 
 Swaminaray Temple 
 રામજી મંદિર
 પીપળે શ્વરમહાદેવ
 કથીરીયા પરિવારના કુળદેવી નું મંદિર

Famous People 
Bhagat Bapu 
Dayaram Bapu

References

Cities and towns in Amreli district

 

Post Office: BALEL-PIPARIA
Post Office Type: BRANCH OFFICE
District: AMRELI
State: GUJARAT
Pin Code: 365460 (Click to see all Post Offices with same Pin Code)
Contact Address: Postmaster, Post Office BALEL-PIPARIA (BRANCH OFFICE), AMRELI, GUJARAT (GJ), India (IN), Pin Code:- 365460
Delivery Status:- DELIVERY
Postal Taluk:- AMRELI
Postal Division:- AMRELI
Postal Region:- RAJKOT
Postal Circle:- GUJARAT{https://pincode.net.in/GUJARAT/AMRELI/B/BALEL-PIPARIA}